Stilk v Myrick [1809] EWHC KB J58 is an English contract law case heard in the King's Bench on the subject of consideration. In his verdict, the judge, Lord Ellenborough decided that in cases where an individual was bound to do a duty under an existing contract, that duty could not be considered valid consideration for a new contract. It has been distinguished from Williams v Roffey Bros & Nicholls (Contractors) Ltd, which suggested that situations formerly handled by consideration could instead be handled by the doctrine of economic duress.

Facts
Stilk was contracted to work on a ship owned by Myrick for £5 a month, promising to do anything needed in the voyage regardless of emergencies. After the ship docked at Cronstadt two men deserted, and after failing to find replacements the captain promised the crew the wages of those two men divided between them if they fulfilled the duties of the missing crewmen as well as their own. After arriving at their home port the captain refused to pay the crew the money he had promised to them.

The defence, represented by Garrow, argued that the agreement between the captain and the sailors or seamen 

was contrary to public policy, and utterly void. In West India voyages, crews are often thinned greatly by death and desertion; and if a promise of advanced wages were valid, exorbitant claims would be set up on all such occasions. This ground was strongly taken by Lord Kenyon in Harris v Watson, Peak. Cas. 72, where that learned Judge held, that no action would lie at the suit of a sailor on a promise of a captain to pay him extra wages, in consideration of his doing more than the ordinary share of duty in navigating the ship; and his Lordship said, that if such a promise could be enforced, sailors would in many cases suffer a ship to sink unless the captain would accede to any extravagant demand they might think proper to make.

The lawyers for the plaintiff attempted to distinguish this case from Harris v Watson by pointing out that the circumstances were completely different, and that the captain had offered the extra money without any pressure being brought to bear by the crewmen.

Judgment
Lord Ellenborough's judgment read:

Significance
Modern commentators say that the decision by the judge not to award the money to the plaintiffs was based at least partly on public policy; should he have done so it would have created precedent that would risk crew members blackmailing captains into giving them more money. It is accepted that the decision would likely be different if it was made in modern times, because of the doctrine of economic duress it would be difficult for such blackmail to be enforced in court. In Hartley v Ponsonby it was held that where a remaining crew were required to do something extra, beyond the scope of their contracts (which unlike in Stilk did not require performance in all emergencies) that the promise of extra pay could be enforced. Another exception to the rule that performing a pre-existing contractual duty is not valid consideration for a new agreement was created in Williams v Roffey Bros & Nicholls (Contractors) Ltd [1991] 1 QB 1 which decided that in such situations the court will be quick to find consideration, if "practical benefits" are given from one to another party. The practical benefit doctrine has recently been extended to a lease agreement which involved the payer of a lesser sum in MWB v Rock Advertising [2016] EWCA Civ 553 which has led to considerable criticism.

See also
English contract law
Uniform Commercial Code section 2-209(1)

References

Bibliography
Books

Articles
P Luther, ‘Campbell, Espinasse and the Sailors’ (1999) 19 Legal Studies 526
M Chen-Wishart, ‘Consideration: Practical Benefit and the Emperor’s New Clothes’ in J Beatson and D Friedmann, Good Faith and Fault in Contract Law (1995) 123

English enforceability case law
English consideration case law
1809 in British law
1809 in case law
Court of King's Bench (England) cases